The 22nd New Brunswick Legislative Assembly represented New Brunswick between February 16, 1871, and May 15, 1874.

Lemuel Allan Wilmot served as Lieutenant-Governor of New Brunswick until  November 1873, when he was replaced by Samuel Leonard Tilley.

E.A. Vail was chosen as speaker.

The Liberal-Conservatives led by George E. King formed the government. George L. Hathaway took over the leadership of the party in February 1871. George E. King became leader again in 1872 after Hathaway's death.

In May 1871, the Common Schools Act was passed; it came into effect the following year. This legislation implemented a system of publicly funded schools. However, it excluded denominational schools; religious instruction in schools operated under the system was banned. The act offended Roman Catholics and Acadians in the province.

History

Members 

Notes:

References 
The Canadian parliamentary companion, HJ Morgan (1871)

Terms of the New Brunswick Legislature
1870 establishments in New Brunswick
1874 disestablishments in New Brunswick